State Road 860 (SR 860), locally known as Miami Gardens Drive or North 183rd Street, is a  east–west street serving bedroom communities in northern Miami-Dade County, Florida.  Its western terminus is a diamond interchange with Interstate 75 (I-75 or SR 93) in the Palm Springs North area near Miami Lakes, passing through Carol City, Miami Gardens, and North Miami Beach before ending at an intersection with Biscayne Boulevard (U.S. Route 1 or US 1/SR 5) in Aventura.  

State Road 860 is a major commuter road passing by major shopping centers and industrial parks separated by suburban communities, and often serves as an alternate to the northern (east–west) segment of the often-congested Palmetto Expressway (SR 826) and the Golden Glades Interchange to the south.

Route description
A four-lane divided highway for most of its route, State Road 860 begins at a diamond interchange (formerly a trumpet interchange prior to 2018) with I-75 and a park and ride facility. The highway heads east as Miami Gardens Drive, as a central artery through a mostly residential area, serving the local commercial businesses, becoming more commercial east of a canal crossing.  It has an intersection with Ludlam Road and then intersects State Road 823 (Red Road/NW 75th Avenue).  East of that intersection, it enters Miami Gardens, with slightly older housing developments than west of SR 823.  It then intersects State Road 847 (NW 47th Avenue) and State Road 817 (NW 27th Avenue), with SR 817, leading to Hard Rock Stadium.  

East of there, SR 860 continues east through residential areas of Miami Gardens, passing under Florida's Turnpike without an interchange, and intersecting with US 441/SR 7 at the eastern end of Miami Gardens.  SR 860 then enters North Miami Beach, passing through a small industrial area before intersecting with I-95, along with State Road 915.  Following the intersection, Miami Gardens Drive continues east into the residential areas of Aventura, traversing in a northeastern direction at a canal crossing and continuing east through condo developments and more housing before reaching its eastern terminus at US 1/SR 5.

History
State Road 860 was applied in the late 1970s to the section of Miami Gardens Drive from Red Road/West 57th Avenue – at that time, the northern terminus of SR 955, now part of SR 823 in Carol City to US 1.  Unlike most Florida State Roads in Miami-Dade County, SR 860 has actually become longer since the designation, as after the completion of I-75 in 1993, the SR 860 designation was extended  westward to connect with the Interstate highway.

Major intersections

References

External links

860
860